Ballico is a census-designated place in Merced County, California, United States. The population was 347 at the 2020 United States census, down from 406 in 2010.

Ballico is located in the northern part of Merced County, just north of where the Santa Fe railroad (the original San Francisco and San Joaquin Valley Railroad line) crosses the Merced River. Delhi is to the west, Denair to the northwest, and Cressey is across the river to the southeast. The ZIP Code is 95303. The community is inside area code 209.

The name is a portmanteau of Ballantine Company, owner of the ranch on which the town was built.

Geography

Demographics

The 2010 United States Census reported that Ballico had a population of 406. The racial makeup of Ballico was 237 (58.4%) White, 2 (0.5%) African American, 3 (0.7%) Native American, 11 (2.7%) Asian, 2 (0.5%) Pacific Islander, 128 (31.5%) from other races, and 23 (5.7%) from two or more races. Hispanic or Latino of any race were 210 persons (51.7%).

The Census reported that 406 people (100% of the population) lived in households, 0 (0%) lived in non-institutionalized group quarters, and 0 (0%) were institutionalized.

There were 121 households, of which 55 (45.5%) had children under the age of 18 living in them, 69 (57.0%) were opposite-sex married couples living together, 10 (8.3%) had a female householder with no husband present, 17 (14.0%) had a male householder with no wife present. There were 13 (10.7%) unmarried opposite-sex partnerships, and 1 (0.8%) same-sex married couples or partnerships. 20 households (16.5%) were made up of individuals, and 8 (6.6%) had someone living alone who was 65 years of age or older. The average household size was 3.36. There were 96 families (79.3% of all households); the average family size was 3.73.

120 people (29.6% of the population) were under the age of 18, 52 (12.8%) were aged 18 to 24, 106 (26.1%) were aged 25 to 44, 91 (22.4%) were aged 45 to 64, and 37 (9.1%) were 65 years of age or older. The median age was 31.1 years. For every 100 females, there were 113.7 males.  For every 100 females age 18 and over, there were 108.8 males.

The homeowner vacancy rate was 1.3%; the rental vacancy rate was 4.3%.  234 people (57.6% of the population) lived in owner-occupied housing units and 172 people (42.4%) lived in rental housing units.

Government

Local
The Turlock Irrigation District provides irrigation water and electrical service.  Ballico and Cressey share an elementary school district.

State and federal

References

Census-designated places in Merced County, California
Census-designated places in California